Cohler is a surname. Notable people with the surname include:

Bertram Cohler (1938–2012), American psychologist, psychoanalyst, and educator
Dianne Cohler-Esses, first Syrian woman rabbi
Gary Cohler, American bridge player
Jonathan Cohler (born 1959), American clarinetist
Matt Cohler (born 1977), American venture capitalist